Heather Ann Garriock (born 21 December 1982) is an Australian former soccer player and coach. Garriock played as a midfielder in a career based mostly in Australia. Her last stint as a player was for Western Sydney Wanderers of the Australian W-League. Garriock played 130  matches for the Australian women's national team, appearing at two Olympic football tournaments and three FIFA Women's World Cups.

Playing career

Club career
Garriock began her career playing football in Australia. She played for Marconi Stallions, NSW Sapphires, and Queensland Sting before moving overseas.

She signed with Adirondack Lynx of Women's Premier Soccer League in 2006. She made six appearances in 2006 before returning to the Australian National Team. In 2007, she made a further five appearances. In total, she made 11 appearances for Adirondack Lynx, while scoring 10 goals and chipping in eight assists.

Garriock was on the move once again in 2008, playing for Fortuna Hjørring in Denmark, before moving back to Australia to play for Sydney FC in the Australian W-League.

In 2009, Garriock was selected for the Women's Professional Soccer league in the United States. In the 2008 WPS International Draft, she was picked 12th overall by Chicago Red Stars. For the inaugural 2009 Women's Professional Soccer season, she appeared for Chicago in 5 games (0 starts, 89 total minutes) and recorded an assist. It was announced on 30 September 2009 that Chicago had waived their option for a second year, thus making Garriock a free agent.

She returned to her previous team, Sydney FC, following her release from Chicago.

In October 2013, Garriock joined Western Sydney Wanderers.

Garriock retired from national league football after the 2013–14 W-League season.

International career

Garriock first represented the Australia in October 1999 in a friendly against China at 16 years old. She has represented her country in the 2000 Summer Olympics in Sydney as well as the 2004 Summer Olympics in Athens.

She has also appeared for Australia in the 2003 and 2007 editions of the FIFA Women's World Cup. She scored two goals in 2003 and one in 2007.

In 2013, Garriock was selected for a national team tour that included a match against the United States, though did not play in the match. After the tour, Football Federation Australia denied a claim from Garriock to cover childcare expenses for her young daughter. A subsequent appeal to the New South Wales Civil and Administrative Tribunal was unsuccessful.

Coaching career
Garriock was appointed senior head coach of the Sydney Uni SFC women's first team in 2014.

In 2017, Garriock was appointed an assistant coach of Australia for the 2017 Algarve Cup.

On 22 May 2017, Garriock was appointed head coach of Canberra United. She was let go in February 2020.

Personal
Garriock was born in Campbelltown in the western suburbs of Sydney. She attended Westfields Sports High School.

Garriock started the Macarthur Youth Football Academy, based in the southwestern Sydney area of Camden.

In 2003, Garriock's brother, Nathan, died from injuries sustained during an altercation at a party he attended in Camden, NSW.

Career statistics

International goals
Scores and results list Australia's goal tally first.

Honours

Playing

Club
NSW Sapphires
 Women's National Soccer League Championship: 1999–2000

Fortuna Hjørring
 Danish Women's Cup: 2007–08

Sydney FC
W-League Premiership: 2009, 2010–11
W-League Championship: 2009

LdB FC Malmö
 Damallsvenskan: 2011
 Svenska Supercupen: 2011

Country
Australia
OFC Women's Championship: 2003
AFC Women's Asian Cup: 2010

Individual
 Julie Dolan Medal: 2002–03

Coaching
Sydney Uni SFC
NPL NSW Women's 1 Coach of the Year: 2014

References

External links
 
 Australia player profile
 Official website
 Sydney FC player profile
 Women's Professional Soccer player profile
 Adirondack Lynx player profile

 

Living people
1982 births
Australian women's soccer players
Sydney FC (A-League Women) players
Western Sydney Wanderers FC (A-League Women) players
Expatriate women's footballers in Denmark
Chicago Red Stars players
Expatriate women's footballers in Sweden
Expatriate women's soccer players in the United States
FIFA Century Club
Olympic soccer players of Australia
Footballers at the 2000 Summer Olympics
Footballers at the 2004 Summer Olympics
2003 FIFA Women's World Cup players
2007 FIFA Women's World Cup players
2011 FIFA Women's World Cup players
Australia women's international soccer players
Soccer players from Sydney
Women's association football midfielders
Adirondack Lynx players
Women's Premier Soccer League players
Damallsvenskan players
FC Rosengård players
Women's Professional Soccer players
Australian expatriate sportspeople in Sweden
Australian expatriate sportspeople in Denmark
Fortuna Hjørring players
Sportswomen from New South Wales